Cerithiopsis iontha is a species of sea snail, a gastropod in the family Cerithiopsidae. It was described by Paul Bartsch in 1911.

References

iontha
Gastropods described in 1911